In accounting and economics the DIRTI 5 is an acronym for "Depreciation, Interest, Repairs, Taxes, and Insurance". Total fixed cost includes the DIRTI 5, which are unavoidable for any capital asset of significant value.

References 

Accounting
Asset
Capital (economics)